Jagbir Singh Malik is a member of the Haryana Legislative Assembly from the Indian National Congress representing the Gohana Vidhan sabha Constituency in Haryana. He has been the three time winner of the state elections. In 2019 he defeated Raj Kumar Saini of Loktanter Suraksha Party by a margin of 4152 votes.

References 

1950 births
Living people
Indian National Congress politicians from Haryana
Haryana Vikas Party politicians
People from Sonipat district
Haryana MLAs 2019–2024
Haryana MLAs 2014–2019